Hibbertia oligocarpa is a species of flowering plant in the family Dilleniaceae and is only known from a single specimen collected near a waterfall near Gunbalanya in the Northern Territory. It is a shrublet with trailing stems, narrow elliptic leaves and yellow flowers with 46 to 58 stamens arranged in groups around four carpels.

Description 
Hibbertia oligocarpa is a shrublet has only a few trailing or scrambling stems. The foliage is covered with bundled, rosette-like hairs. There are 46 to 58 stamens in bundles around four carpels, each with two ovules. Flowering has been observed in May.

Taxonomy 
Hibbertia oligocarpa was first formally described in 2010 by Hellmut R. Toelken in the Journal of the Adelaide Botanic Gardens from specimens collected near Gunbalanya (formerly known as Oenpelli) by Joseph Zvonko Weber in 1988. The specific epithet (oligocarpa) means "few-fruited".

Distribution and habitat 
This hibbertia is only known from the type collection that was growing over rocks near a waterfall near Gunbalanya in the Northern Territory.

See also 
 List of Hibbertia species

References 

oligocarpa
Flora of the Northern Territory
Plants described in 2010
Taxa named by Hellmut R. Toelken